Banditi a Orgosolo  (Bandits of Orgosolo) is a 1960 Italian film drama directed by Vittorio De Seta. The film stars Vittorina Pisano. De Seta won an Award for the film at the Venice Film Festival.

Cast
Vittorina Pisanu ...  Mintonia
Michele Cossu ...  Michele Cossu
Peppeddu Cuccu ...  Peppeddu Cossu

Plot
Michele, a shepherd of Orgosolo unfairly charged with rustling and murder, is forced to take to the hills.  In his flight into the inaccessible areas of Barbagia, where there is neither water nor pastures, he loses every sheep in his flock.

One night, desperate because he is full of debts, and with impending trials up ahead, he goes into the sheepfold of another shepherd and, at gunpoint, steals every sheep.

Michele has become a bandit.

See also
Il mondo perduto
Détour De Seta

External links
 

1960 films
1960 drama films
Italian black-and-white films
Italian drama films
1960s Italian-language films
Films shot in Sardinia
Films set in Sardinia
1960s Italian films